Francesco da Chiaravalle (died 1450) was a Roman Catholic prelate who served as Bishop of Montefeltro (1444–1450).

Biography
On 20 Nov 1444, Francesco da Chiaravalle was appointed during the papacy of Pope Eugene IV as Bishop of Montefeltro.
He served as Bishop of Montefeltro until his death in 1450.

References 

15th-century Italian Roman Catholic bishops
Bishops appointed by Pope Eugene IV
1450 deaths